Kasara is a village located in Maunath Bhanjan tehsil of Mau district, Uttar Pradesh. It has total 922 families residing. Kasara has population of 6,047 as per government records.

Administration
Kasara village is administrated by Pradhan who is elected representative of village as per constitution of India and Panchyati Raj Act.

Educational hub
This village is educational hub for surrounding villages, having several schools and college there. There is one Jawahar Navodaya Vidyalaya established by the Ministry of Human Resource Development, Government of India. Apart from JNV there are several other colleges in Kasara. 

 Jawahar Navodaya Vidyalaya
 Indian Public School
 Dawn Washco School
 Permanand Inter College
 ANS Enterprises (Poultry Enterprise)

References

External links
Villages in Mau Uttar Pradesh

Villages in Mau district